Luxor is a 2020 romantic drama film that was screened at the 2020 Sundance Film Festival in the World Cinema Dramatic Competition. It runs for 85 minutes. The film is in English and Arabic with English subtitles. It was directed by Zeina Durra. It is about a young aid worker, Hanna, who becomes overwhelmed by treating victims from the Syrian war, takes a solo trip to Egypt and runs into an old flame. It was released on November 6, 2020 in digital formats.

Plot 
When British aid worker Hana returns to the ancient city of Luxor, she comes across Sultan, a talented archaeologist and former lover. As she wanders, haunted by the familiar place, she struggles to reconcile the choices of the past with the uncertainty of the present.

Cast 
 Andrea Riseborough as Hana
 Michael Landes as Carl
 Shereen Reda as Dunia
 Karim Saleh as Sultan

Reception 
It has a 90% rating on Rotten Tomatoes with 61 ratings and a score of 69 on Metacritic. Critics write "it is a beautifully sparse character study", and particularly praise Riseborough's acting.

References

External links 
 

2020 films
2020 romantic drama films
2020 multilingual films
British multilingual films
British romantic drama films
Egyptian multilingual films
Egyptian romantic drama films
2020s British films